The men's qualification for the Olympic water polo tournament will occur between July 2023 and February 2024, allocating twelve teams for the final tournament. As the host nation, France reserves a direct spot each for the men's team.

The remainder of the total quota will be attributed to the eligible NOCs through a tripartite qualification pathway. First, the 2023 World Aquatics Championships, scheduled for 16 to 29 July in Fukuoka, Japan, will produce the winners and runners-up of the men's water polo tournament qualifying for Paris 2024. Five more quota places will be awarded to the highest-ranked eligible NOC at each of the continental meets (Africa, Americas, Asia, Europe, and Oceania) approved by World Aquatics. If any of the continental qualifying tournaments does not occur within the qualifying period, the vacant spot will be entitled to the highest-ranked eligible NOC from a respective continent at the succeeding edition of the Worlds.

The last batch of quota places will be assigned to the four highest-ranked eligible NOCs at the 2024 World Aquatics Championships in Doha, Qatar to complete the twelve-team field for the Games.

Qualification summary
{| class="wikitable" width=80%
|-
!width=30%|Qualification!!width=23%|Date!!width=22%|Host!!width=10%|Berths!!width=15%|Qualified team
|-
|Host country
|colspan=2 
|align=center|1
|
|-
|rowspan=2|2023 World Aquatics Championships 
|rowspan=2|16–29 July 2023 
|rowspan=2| Fukuoka 
|rowspan=2 align="center"|2 
|
|-
|
|-
|2022 Asian Games 
|23 September – 8 October 2023
| Hangzhou
|align=center|1
|
|-
|2023 European Championships 
|7–21 October 2023
| Tel Aviv|align=center|1
|
|-
|2023 Pan American Games 
|20 October – 5 November 2023
| Santiago
|align=center|1
|
|-
|rowspan=4|2024 World Aquatics Championships
|rowspan=6|2–18 February 2024
|rowspan=6| Doha
|rowspan=4 align=center|4
|
|-
|
|-
|
|-
|
|-
|2024 World Aquatics Championships – Africa
|align=center|1
|
|-
|2024 World Aquatics Championships – Oceania
|align=center|1
|
|-
! colspan=3| Total !! 12 !!
|}

2023 World Championships

The winner and the runner-up of the men's water polo tournament at the 2023 World Aquatics Championships in Fukuoka, Japan will obtain a ticket for Paris 2024.

Bracket

Rankings

Continental tournaments
The highest-ranked eligible NOC from each of the five continental qualification tournaments (Africa, Americas, Asia, Europe, and Oceania) will secure a quota place for Paris 2024. If any of the continental qualifying tournaments does not occur within the qualifying period, the vacant spot will be entitled to the highest-ranked eligible NOC from a respective continent at the succeeding edition of the Worlds.

Asia

Pool
Group A

Group B

Bracket

Final rankings

Europe

Pool
Group A

Group B

Bracket

Final rankings

Americas

Qualified teams

Pool
Group A

Group B

Bracket

Final rankings

2024 World Championships

The top four teams of the men's water polo tournament at the 2024 World Aquatics Championships in Doha, Qatar will obtain a ticket for Paris 2024.

Bracket

Rankings

References

Qualification for the 2024 Summer Olympics
Men